Helmut Kollars (born 1968 in Graz) is an Austrian illustrator and writer of children's books.

Biography
Kollars first set up a business as a freelance illustrator in Vienna. Stifled by laws in Austria that required artists to carry health insurance, Kollars moved his family to Cork, Ireland, in 1997. He established a company there and carried on a successful career as an illustrator for publishing and advertising in Ireland, Belgium and the US. He eventually moved his business back to Europe and settled in Kassel, Germany. Along with illustrations in books, his poster art is widely available.

Works

Besides his illustrations for other authors, Kollars has written and illustrated several children's books of his own. Selected titles include:
Es war einmal ein Zauberer ganz allein, 1996
Der Vergessene Zauberspruch, 1997
Mein Bilderbuch von der Baustelle, 2005
Bingo! Lernquartett - Die 4 Fälle / Kurze Märchen: 3. Klasse Grundschule, 2005
Lernquartett: Die 4 Fälle, 2005
Sterreich-Atlas fnr Kinder, 2007

Awards
Two of Kollars' children's books published by Annette Betz have won awards.
Es war einmal ein Zauberer ganz allein, 1996 
Braver Bertram - Wilde Winni, 1996

Personal life
In Vienna Kollars met the young singer, songwriter and guitarist Pina Pertl. The couple eloped to Scotland, returned briefly to Vienna and then permanently relocated to Ireland where Kollars set up his business as an illustrator. The couple had a daughter, Luise Magdalena, but divorced before the recording of Pina Kollars' first album Quick Look.

References

Artists from Vienna
Writers from Vienna
Austrian children's writers
Austrian children's book illustrators
1968 births
Living people